The Canadian Soccer League championship final or CSL Championship is the post-season match of the Canadian Soccer League (CSL) and is the successor to the CNSL Championship. The winner is crowned champion in the same manner as in other North American sports leagues (i.e. via a playoff following a regular season). This differs from other top soccer leagues around the world which consider the club with the most points at the end of the season to be the sole champion. It is a Non-FIFA championship match that was previously sanctioned by the Canadian Soccer Association (CSA) but is now affiliated with the Soccer Federation of Canada (SFC).

The league hosted its inaugural championship, on October 14, 1998. The CSL Championship is traditionally held in early October. Toronto Croatia is the most successful team, winning a record sixth cup in 2015.

Throughout its history, the championship has had several title sponsors from the Primus Cup in 2000, the Rogers Cup from 2001 to 2009, and the Givova Cup from 2010 onwards.

History 
In the initial years, the championship finals were dominated by Toronto Olympians, and Ottawa Wizards, who had financial support from corporations such as Coffee Time, and Oz Optics Ltd. While St. Catharines Wolves, and Toronto Croatia two well-established former Canadian National Soccer League (CNSL) clubs were the prominent challengers in the early years. The inaugural championship was contested between the 1997 CNSL champions St. Catharines and Toronto Olympians with the Wolves securing the title in a penalty shootout. St. Catharines would conclude their golden decade in 2001 with their second championship acquired against Toronto Supra. While the Olympians appeared in the first three CPSL Championship finals, but only managed one victory in 1999 against Toronto Croatia. The Croatians would avenge their defeat the following season after defeating the Olympians 2–0.

In 2000, the championship received its first title sponsorship from Primus and witnessed the emergence of the Ottawa Wizards after the league's major expansion run in 2001. The heavily invested Wizards would dominate the next three seasons with an eventual championship in 2002. After a series of disputes with the CPSL board of directors, Ottawa withdrew from the playoff competition after securing an undefeated regular season in 2003. As a result, creating an opportunity for various clubs to contend for the championship with the Brampton Hitmen claiming the title. After the decline and departure of the Olympians, Wizards, and Wolves a shift occurred with Croatia and York Region Shooters (then as the Vaughan Shooters, later as Italia Shooters) achieving a powerhouse status as both champions and top contenders with the Serbian White Eagles as the prominent challengers. The reemergence of the White Eagles re-sparked the traditional rivalry between Croatia and Serbia, which caused the 2007 championship final to be divided into two matches to segregate the fans.

Toronto Croatia currently holds the record amount of six championships and holds the distinction of being the first club to successfully defend the title in two consecutive seasons from 2014 till 2015. As the league expanded beyond the Greater Toronto Area and Ontario border a television agreement was reached with Rogers TV, which granted the company naming rights to the championship. In 2010, Givova became the title sponsor for the league and championship. Meanwhile, another milestone was achieved by Trois-Rivières Attak the farm team to the Montreal Impact as it became the first Quebec club to capture the championship in 2009 after defeating Serbia in a 3-2 penalty shootout. Other single champions have included the likes of the Oakville Blue Devils, Brantford Galaxy, and SC Waterloo Region. In 2014, York Region became the second club in the league's history to produce a perfect season followed by the Toronto Olympians since the 1999 season.

Format
After the regular season, the top eight finishers qualify for the play-offs. Those then consist of quarter-finals, semi-finals, and the championship final. Except for the 2007 final, which was contested over two legs, the final is played like one match only.

Champions 
The winner of the Canadian Soccer League's CSL Championship determines the season's league champion. The playoff tournament is organized by the league after the regular season in a format similar to other North American professional sports leagues.

The first CSL Championship final was played on October 14, 1998. As of 2017, the record for the most championships is held by  Toronto Croatia with six cup titles. The record for the most championships lost is held by Scarborough SC, who lost the game four times during their history.

Results

Performance by Club

References

External links
 
 List of Past Champions

Canadian Soccer League (1998–present)
Soccer cup competitions in Canada
Annual sporting events in Canada
Recurring sporting events established in 1998